Queen Elizabeth Park is a park in Masterton, Wairarapa, New Zealand, beside the Waipoua River. It was named Masterton Park until 1954, when it was renamed in honour of Queen Elizabeth II after her visit to Masterton. The park has gardens and a lake, as well as sports grounds, a large playground and a miniature railway.

Cricket ground
The cricket ground in the park was developed for local cricket in 1881. The first major match at the ground was held in 1907 when Wairarapa played the touring Marylebone Cricket Club. In December 1910 the ground staged the first match in the inaugural season of the Hawke Cup, when Wairarapa hosted Manawatu.

The ground held its first first-class match during the 1966/67 Plunket Shield when Central Districts played Auckland.  Between the 1966/67 and 2002/03 seasons, twelve first-class matches were held there, the last of which saw Central Districts play Wellington in the 2002/03 State Championship.  Between the 1980/81 and 2004/05 season, Central Districts played five List A matches at Queen Elizabeth Park.

Central Districts Women used Queen Elizabeth Park as a home venue between 2002 and 2010. It is the home ground for the Wairarapa men's team that competes in the Hawke Cup, and the administrative offices of the Wairarapa Cricket Association are nearby.

References

External links

Queen Elizabeth Park at ESPNcricinfo
Queen Elizabeth Park at CricketArchive

1881 establishments in New Zealand
Parks in New Zealand
Cricket grounds in New Zealand
Sports venues in the Wellington Region